The Medžitlija-Níki border crossing linking North Macedonia with Greece is one of the three transit points for road vehicles between the two states. Situated about 190 km from Thessaloniki and the same to Skopje, it also once served as Yugoslavia's southernmost exit. It is located on the European route E65.

Despite linking the important city of Bitola with the regions of western Greece including Corfu and other holiday spots, it is the other crossing Evzoni-Bogorodica which is of greater significance as it forms a part of the E75 express route. The region around Medžitlija -Niki is far less developed on both sides of the border. 

From 1998 to 2000, the northern side of the border (North Macedonia's transit blocks) was rebuilt using donations from the European Union to raise the standards.

External links
Macedonian customs

Greece–North Macedonia border crossings